Srimushnam V. Raja Rao (born 1955) is an Indian mridangam player and Carnatic vocalist. 

He received his initial training in Mridangam from his father S. Venkataramana Rao. He was later a student of Shri Kumbakonam M Rajappa Iyer. He has also received training in Carnatic vocal music from eminent teachers including Sarvashri Papanasam Sivan, Calcutta Krishnamurthy, and Mayuram Vaidyanatha Iyer.  Besides Mridangam, he also plays the Kanjira and Morsing. He has worked as a visiting professor of Mridangam at the University of California, Berkeley, USA.

In the 2018 music season, Madras Music Academy dropped Rao from its programming due to allegations of sexual harassment against him.

Awards 

 Award from Kanchi Mahaswami, 2010
 Sangeetha Choodamani by Sri Krishna Gana Sabha, Chennai 2011
 Sangeet Natak Academy Ratna Fellow from the Government of India, 2010

References

External links
Citation on the Sangeet Natak Academy website

1955 births
Living people
Mridangam players
Recipients of the Sangeet Natak Akademi Award